Liyumen station is a station on Line 1 of the Shenzhen Metro in Shenzhen, Guangdong Province, China. The station opened on 15 June 2011.

Station layout

Exits

References

External links
 Shenzhen Metro Liyumen Station (Chinese)
 Shenzhen Metro Liyumen Station (English)

Railway stations in Guangdong
Shenzhen Metro stations
Nanshan District, Shenzhen
Railway stations in China opened in 2011